The DFB-Pokal ( is a German knockout football cup competition held annually by the German Football Association (DFB). Sixty-four teams participate in the competition, including all clubs from the Bundesliga and the 2. Bundesliga. It is considered the second-most important club title in German football after the Bundesliga championship. Taking place from August until May, the winner qualifies for the DFL-Supercup and the UEFA Europa League unless the winner already qualifies for the UEFA Champions League in the Bundesliga.

The competition was founded in 1935, then called the Tschammer-Pokal. The first titleholders were 1. FC Nürnberg. In 1937, Schalke 04 were the first team to win the double. The Tschammer-Pokal was suspended in 1944 due to World War II and disbanded following the demise of Nazi Germany. In 1952–53, the cup was reinstated in West Germany as the DFB-Pokal, named after the DFB, and was won by Rot-Weiss Essen. (FDGB-Pokal, the East German equivalent, started in 1949 and operated through the 1991 season, when it merged with the DFB-Pokal).

Bayern Munich have won a record 20 titles. The current holders are RB Leipzig, who beat SC Freiburg 4–2 on penalties in the 2022 final to win their first title. Fortuna Düsseldorf hold the record for most consecutive tournament game wins (18) between 1978 and 1981, winning the cup in 1979 and 1980.

Format

The competition format has varied considerably since the inception of the Tschammer-Pokal in 1935.

Participation
The DFB-Pokal begins with a round of 64 teams. The 36 teams of the Bundesliga and 2. Bundesliga, along with the top four finishers of the 3. Liga are automatically qualified for the tournament. Of the remaining slots 21 are given to the cup winners of the regional football associations, the Verbandspokale. The three remaining slots are given to the three regional associations with the most men's teams. They may assign the slot as they see fit but usually give it to the runner-up in the association cup. 

As every team taking part in the German football league system is entitled to participate in local tournaments which qualify for the association cups, every team can, in principle, compete in the DFB-Pokal. The only exception is that reserve teams (e.g. Bayern Munich II) are ineligible to enter.

Seeding
For the first round, the 64 teams are split into two pots of 32. One pot contains the 18 teams from the previous season of the Bundesliga and the top 14 teams from the previous season of the 2. Bundesliga. The other pot contains the bottom 4 teams from the previous season of the 2. Bundesliga, the top 4 teams from the previous season of the 3. Liga and the 24 amateur teams that qualified through regional football tournaments. Teams from one pot are drawn against teams from the other pot. Since 1982, teams from the pot containing amateur teams have played the game at home.

For the second round, the teams are again divided into two pots according to the same principles. Depending on the results of the first round, the pots might not be equal in terms of number. Teams from one pot are drawn against teams from the other pot until one pot is empty. The remaining teams are then drawn against each other with the team first drawn playing the game at home.

For the remaining rounds, other than the final, the teams are drawn from one pot. Since 1985, the final has been held in the Olympic Stadium in Berlin.

Match rules
Extra time will be played if the scores are level after 90 minutes with a penalty shootout following if needed.

History

Historically the number of participants in the main tournament has varied between four from 1956 until 1960 and 128 from 1973 through 1982 resulting in tournaments of two to seven rounds. Since the inception of the Bundesliga in 1963 all clubs from the Bundesliga are automatically qualified for the DFB-Pokal as are all clubs from the 2. Bundesliga since its inception in 1974. Reserve sides for most of the time were allowed to participate in the DFB-Pokal but have been excluded since 2008.

The final has been held at the Olympic Stadium in Berlin every season since 1985. Before 1985, the host of the final was determined on short notice. In the decision, the German Football Association took into consideration that, due to the political situation between Germany and East Germany, Berlin was not chosen to be a venue for the UEFA Euro 1988.

Originally the cup games were held over two 45 minute halves with two 15 minute overtime periods in case of a draw. If the score was still level after 120 minutes the game was replayed with the home field right reversed. In the 1939 Tschammer-Pokal the semi-final between Waldhof Mannheim and Wacker Wien was played to a draw three times before the game was decided by lot. The German Football Association decided to hold a penalty shootout if the replay was another draw after a similar situation arose in the 1970 cup, when the match between Alemannia Aachen and Werder Bremen had to be decided by lot after two draws.

In 1971–72 and 1972–73, the matches were held over two legs. The second leg was extended by two additional 15-minute overtime periods if the aggregate was a draw after both legs. In case the extension brought no decision, a penalty shootout was held.

In 1977, the final 1. FC Köln vs. Hertha BSC had to be replayed, leading to great logistical difficulties. In the aftermath, the DFB opted not to replay cup finals in the future, instead holding a penalty shootout after extra time. Eventually, this change was extended to all cup games in 1991.

International qualification
Since 1960, the winner of the DFB-Pokal qualified for the European Cup Winners' Cup. If the cup winner had already qualified for the European Club Champions Cup, the losing finalist moved into the Cup Winners' Cup instead. Following the abolition of the Cup Winners' Cup in 1999, the winner of the DFB-Pokal qualified for the UEFA Cup, known as the UEFA Europa League since 2009. If the DFB-Pokal winner or both finalists qualify through the Bundesliga for European cup competitions, the best placed team of the Bundesliga not already qualified for at least the Europa League receives the spot.

Tschammerpokal
The first German cup was held in 1935. It was then called von Tschammer und Osten Pokal, or Tschammerpokal for short, named after Reichssportführer (Sports Chief of the Reich) Hans von Tschammer und Osten. The first final was contested between the two most successful clubs of that era, 1. FC Nürnberg and Schalke 04, with Nürnberg winning 2–0. After the last Tschammerpokal was held in 1943, the cup was not held for almost ten years, being re-introduced by the German Football Association (DFB) in 1952 under its current name, DFB-Pokal. In 1965, the original trophy, Goldfasanen-Pokal, was replaced by the trophy which is still awarded today, because the original reminded DFB president Peco Bauwens of the Nazi era.

Giant killing

Originally, the DFB-Pokal was a competition open to clubs from the top divisions of German football only. This continued after the establishment of the Bundesliga in 1963. Semi-professional and amateur clubs could only enter the competition from 1974 onwards, when it was enlarged. Up until 2008, only the top two divisions of German football, the Bundesliga and 2. Bundesliga, were fully professional but from 2008, with the establishment of the 3. Liga, the third tier also became fully professional.

From the start, the new match ups between Bundesliga and amateurs (most usually third division clubs) became a source of surprises. Hamburger SV's second round loss to VfB Eppingen in 1974 was often titled the "mother of all cup upsets", the first instance of an amateur side knocking out a Bundesliga club. It took until 1990 for a fourth division side to achieve the same, when SpVgg Fürth took Borussia Dortmund out of the competition. Further milestones were the reserve side of Hertha BSC, Hertha BSC II, reaching the cup final in 1993, a first for a third division club and a reserve team. In 1997 Eintracht Trier proved too strong for both the UEFA Cup and Champions League winners, knocking Schalke 04 and Borussia Dortmund out of the competition. In 2000, 1. FC Magdeburg became the first fourth division side to eliminate two Bundesliga clubs in one season. Hannover 96, then playing in the 2. Bundesliga, became cup winners after eliminating several Bundesliga teams in the process. Kickers Offenbach won all matches including the semi final as a 2. Bundesliga team, but were promoted to the Bundesliga a week before they won the cup final.

Surprise results in the cup attract strong media coverage in Germany and, at times, abroad. When TSV Vestenbergsgreuth eliminated Bayern Munich in 1994, who were then coached by the Italian Giovanni Trapattoni, Italian sports daily La Gazzetta dello Sport reported on its front page "Club di dilettanti elimina Trapattoni" ("Amateur club eliminate Trapattoni").

Records
Having won 20 titles, Bayern Munich has been the most successful team in the cup since they won their fourth title in 1969. Fortuna Düsseldorf established a record for consecutive German Cup match victories (18 straight victories between 1978 and 1981, taking the trophy in 1979 and 1980). Werder Bremen had won the most consecutive home games (37) from 1988 to 2019. Bayern Munich has won the most consecutive away games (33) from 2009 to 2020. Schalke 04 holds the record for the biggest win in a DFB-Pokal final, winning 5–0 against 1. FC Kaiserslautern in 1972 and 5–0 against MSV Duisburg in 2011.

Finals

Tschammer-Pokal

DFB-Pokal

Performance by club

Winning managers

East German Cup (1949–91)

East Germany also had its own national cup: the FDGB Cup, the cup of the  Freie Deutsche Gewerkschaftsbund, the association of the East German trade unions. It was introduced in 1949 and awarded annually until 1991 after German reunification in 1990 led to the merger of the football leagues of the two Germanys.

Women's German Cup

Since 1981 women's football clubs have competed for the DFB-Pokal Frauen. An East German women's cup was also held from 1987 to 1991.

Media coverage

2022–2026

Germany
ARD and ZDF will broadcast 15 matches per season. All matches are available on Sky Sport.

International

Notes

References

External links 

 DFB Pokal German Cup page from DFB 
 DFB Pokal German Cup page from DFB
  League321.com – National cup results
 (West) Germany – List of Cup Finals at the RSSSF

 
1
Germany
Recurring sporting events established in 1935
1935 establishments in Germany